Mongolian Airlines can refer to multiple airlines based in Mongolia:
 MIAT Mongolian Airlines, the largest airline and flag carrier
 Mongolian Airlines, a smaller airline, now called Hunnu Air